The  1942 German football championship, the 35th edition of the competition, was won by Schalke 04, the club's sixth championship, won by defeating First Vienna FC in the final. It marked the third and last occasion of a club from Vienna (German: Wien) in the final, Rapid Wien having won the competition in the previous season while Admira Wien had made a losing appearance in the 1939 final. It was the last time that Schalke was awarded the Viktoria, the annual trophy for the German champions from 1903 to 1944 as the trophy disappeared during the final stages of the Second World War.

Schalke's Fritz Szepan was the 1942 championships top scorer with eight goals.

The 1942 championship marked the last highlight of the golden era of Schalke 04 which had reached the semi-finals of each edition of the national championship from 1932 to 1942 and won the competition in 1934, 1935, 1937, 1939, 1940 and 1942 while losing the final in 1933, 1938 and 1941. By appearing in the 1942 final Schalke also equaled Hertha BSC's record of six consecutive final appearances which the latter had set from 1926 to 1931. Schalke would however not win another German championship until 1958.

The twenty-five  1941–42 Gauliga champions, five more than in the previous season, competed in a single-leg knock out competition to determine the national champion. In the following season, the German championship was played with twenty nine clubs. From there it gradually expanded further through a combination of territorial expansion of Nazi Germany and the sub-dividing of the Gauligas in later years, reaching a strength of thirty one in its last completed season, 1943–44.

Qualified teams
The teams qualified through the 1941–42 Gauliga season:

Competition

Qualifying round

|align="center" style="background:#ddffdd" colspan=3|10 May 1942

|}

Replay

|align="center" style="background:#ddffdd" colspan=3|17 May 1942

|}

Round of 16

|align="center" style="background:#ddffdd" colspan=3|24 May 1942

|}

Quarter-finals

|align="center" style="background:#ddffdd" colspan=3|7 June1942

|}

Semi-finals

|align="center" style="background:#ddffdd" colspan=3|21 June 1942

|}

Third place play-off

Final

References

Sources
 kicker Allmanach 1990, by kicker, page 164 & 177 - German championship

External links
 German Championship 1941–42 at weltfussball.de 
 German Championship 1942 at RSSSF

1
German
German football championship seasons